Wharekahika or Hicks Bay (officially Wharekahika / Hicks Bay) is a bay and coastal area in the Gisborne District of the North Island of New Zealand. It is situated 150 km east of Opotiki and 186 km north of Gisborne city, along State Highway 35 between Potaka and Te Araroa.

The area is named after Zachary Hickes, second-in-command of James Cook's Endeavour, which sailed along the East Cape on 31 October 1769. On 10 June 2019, the name of the bay was officially changed to Wharekahika / Hicks Bay.

Demographics
It is part of the wider East Cape statistical area.

Hicks Bay had a population of 162 at the 2018 New Zealand census, an increase of 9 people (5.9%) since the 2013 census, and an increase of 15 people (10.2%) since the 2006 census. There were 54 households, comprising 75 males and 87 females, giving a sex ratio of 0.86 males per female. The median age was 26.6 years (compared with 37.4 years nationally), with 57 people (35.2%) aged under 15 years, 30 (18.5%) aged 15 to 29, 57 (35.2%) aged 30 to 64, and 18 (11.1%) aged 65 or older.

Ethnicities were 14.8% European/Pākehā, 96.3% Māori, and 1.9% Pacific peoples. People may identify with more than one ethnicity.

Although some people chose not to answer the census's question about religious affiliation, 50.0% had no religion, 37.0% were Christian, 1.9% had Māori religious beliefs and 1.9% had other religions.

Of those at least 15 years old, 15 (14.3%) people had a bachelor's or higher degree, and 27 (25.7%) people had no formal qualifications. The median income was $20,000, compared with $31,800 nationally. 9 people (8.6%) earned over $70,000 compared to 17.2% nationally. The employment status of those at least 15 was that 39 (37.1%) people were employed full-time, 15 (14.3%) were part-time, and 9 (8.6%) were unemployed.

Marae

The local Hinemaurea ki Wharekahika Marae is a meeting place for the Ngāti Porou hapū of Ngāti Tuere, Te Whānau a Te Aotakī and Te Whānau a Tuwhakairiora. It includes the Tūwhakairiora meeting house.

In October 2020, the Government committed $520,760 from the Provincial Growth Fund to upgrade Hinemaurea ki Wharekahika Marae and Pōtaka Marae, creating 12 jobs.

Education

Te Kura Kaupapa Māori o Kawakawa Mai Tawhiti is a Year 1–13 Māori language immersion school.

References 

Bays of the Gisborne District
Populated places in the Gisborne District